The 2010–11 National Premier League (also known as the 2010–11 Digicel Premier League) is the highest competitive football league in Jamaica. The regular season began August 29, 2010 and will be completed May 1, 2011.  The teams will play each other 3 times each then the final 5 games will be played amongst the top 6 and bottom 6; making it a total of 38 games each. Harbour View were the defending champions, having won their third Jamaican championship last season.

Tropical storm Nicole caused a number of games to be postponed.

Teams 
Rivoli United and August Town finished 11th and 12th at the end of last season and were relegated to lower leagues.

Taking their places in the league this season are Benfica and Reno, which were the best two clubs in last season's second level promotion playoffs.

Regular stage

League table

Results

Matches 1–22

Matches 23–33

Championship playoff

Standings

Relegation playoff

Standings

Top goalscorers 

Updated to games played on 24 February 2011
Source: Soccerway

Promotion from Super Leagues
The winners of the 4 regional Super Leagues play-off in a home and home round robin series.
KSAFA Super League - Cavalier
South Central Confederation Super League - Rivoli United
Eastern Confederation Super League - Highgate United
Western Confederation Super League - Seba United

Results

References

External links 
 Official Site
 play-off results

National Premier League seasons
1
Jam